The 1913 Alberta general election was held in March 1913. The writ was dropped on 25 March 1913 and election day was held 17 April 1913 to elect 56 members to the 3rd Alberta Legislature. Elections in two northern districts took place on 30 July 1913 to compensate for the remote location of the riding. The method to elect members was under the First Past the Post voting system with the exception of the Edmonton district which returned two members under a plurality block vote. The election was unusual with the writ period for the general election being a very short period of 23 days.

Premier Arthur Sifton led the Alberta Liberal Party into his first election as leader, after taking over from Alexander Rutherford. Premier Rutherford had resigned for his government's involvement in the Alberta and Great Waterways Railway Scandal but remained a sitting member. Sifton faced great criticism for calling the snap election, after ramming gerrymandered electoral boundaries through the legislature, running up the provincial debt and neglecting on promised railways. The Socialist Party carried the banner for labour- and farmer-minded voters in five constituencies; in others, Independent candidates were of distinctively leftist sentiment.

Edward Michener, the official opposition leader of the Conservative Party, ended up capitalizing on anger toward the Sifton government. He would lead the largest opposition to date in Alberta history. The Liberals would win a comfortable majority of seats despite being almost even in the popular vote. The Socialist Party vote would collapse and lose their only seat as Charles M. O'Brien went down to defeat at the hands of a Conservative.

Events leading to the election

The campaign

The writ of election was issued after a sitting of the house on the night of 25 March 1913. The premier dropped the election writ and dissolved the house after he ensured that the governments legislation on new electoral boundaries had been given Royal Assent. The new boundaries gave the Liberals an advantage, not only were they blatantly gerrymandered to their favour, but the opposition and even private citizens had a tough time figuring out what district they were in.

Day one of the campaign brought controversy as it was reported that Hotel organizers and Liquor establishments were being expected to donate generously to the Liberal campaign in order to get licence renewals for their establishments.

Arthur Sifton, his lieutenant Charles Cross and Liberal candidate Alexander Grant MacKay each won nominations in two electoral districts. The Calgary Herald (a Conservative newspaper) surmised that Sifton and Cross were so scared of the electorate they felt they might not win if they ran in just one district. It accused Premier Sifton of having little confidence in his ability to return his government to power.

The Liberal government in order to prevent possible vote splitting made promises of concessions to trade unions and labour organizations so that they would not publicly support leftist candidates.

The Conservative Party protested the snap election by filing a legal injunction in the Supreme Court, to prevent the election from being held on 17 April 1913. The grounds for the injunction were based on the date of nomination closure being in violation of statue. The writs were issued with nomination day being 10 April 1913. The Conservatives argued that this was 10 hours short of the 16 full days prescribed in the Elections Ordinance, and the election should be ruled invalid.

Election issues

The big issues of the election centred on the Sifton government's lack of infrastructure building in Southern Alberta.

The ballooning Alberta debt which in a few years had gone from C$2 million to C$27 million was talked about often.

Gerrymandered boundaries
Prior to the dropping of the writ the Sifton government forced a bill through the Legislative Assembly of Alberta. The bill was entitled Bill 90: An Act to Amend an Act concerning members elected to the Legislative assembly of Alberta It was introduced in the assembly on 20 March 1913 and given Royal Assent on 25 March 1913.

The bill increased the number of MLAs in the province by 15. Calgary was divided into two single-member districts; Edmonton continued as two-member district. The single-member districts did not contain equal population, with one riding Clearwater, north of Edmonton, only containing 74 people enumerated. Calgary Centre was the largest population wise with 20,000 people enumerated. The bill drew districts so that a line at the centre of the province's population (about in line with Red Deer), gave 30 seats to the people of the north half with 26 seats to the southern half. (The bill drew districts so that a line at the centre of the province (about in line with Edmonton), gave 19 seats to the north half of the province, up from the previous 13, with 37 seats in the south half, nine more than previously.)

The Conservative and Socialist opposition vigorously opposed the bill, but failed to pass any amendments. The bill was jammed through third reading in the 25 March legislative sitting and given Royal Assent that evening, just shy of the writ of elections being dropped.

Siftonism

The Liberal campaign was dubbed "Siftonism" inferring that Sifton was a disease that needed to be cleaned from Alberta. The media at the time picked up on that, and roasted the Liberal party. The Conservative party attacked the Liberals on the Railway Scandal and Lack of provincial infrastructure.

Electoral system
First-past-the-post voting was used in the single-member districts.

In Edmonton the seats were filled through Plurality block voting, where each voter could cast two votes. (Unusually for block voting, in Edmonton, candidates of two different parties were elected. Usually block voting produces a one-party sweep of a district's seats, as had been done in Edmonton in 1909.)

Results
The final result was the Liberal Party, under its new leader, Arthur L. Sifton, won a third term in office, defeating the Conservative Party, which was once again led by Edward Michener. Liberal party candidates took 49 percent of the vote and with the election of 38 members, the party took 68 percent of the seats in the Legislature.

The opposition received a much higher proportion of the votes than it had done in 1909 and increased its seat count to 17 from 2, while the Liberals again got more votes than any other party and won many of the new seats, allowing them to hang onto a majority.

The votes were split almost evenly between the Conservatives and Liberals with a difference of 4 percent separating the two parties. In the Rocky Mountain constituency, the Socialist vote doubled but the vote for the Conservative went up even more, to make that candidate the winner, and the Socialist Party lost its only seat in the Assembly.

Oddly, the Assembly did not have its full complement of MLAs after the election, as C.W. Cross was elected to two seats (one Edmonton seat and Edson). When this happened elsewhere, such as Laurier's election as MP in both the North-West Territories (including part of what would be Alberta) and Quebec, the double winner resigned one of the seats. But Cross held both seats until the next general election.

Summary

Note
Charles Cross ran in and won in two ridings.
Arthur Sifton and Alexander G. MacKay ran for the Liberals in two districts but only won in 1 district.
Liberal-Labor candidates were a result of the Liberal Labour coalition struck by Premier Sifton prior to the election, these candidates ran in place of Liberals. See also Liberal-Labour (Canada).
Liberal-Labor popular vote is included in Liberal vote.

Members elected
For complete electoral history, see individual districts

|-
|Acadia
||
|John A. McColl63756.27%
|
|W.D. Bentley49543.73%
|
|
|
|New District
|-
|Alexandra
|
|N.C. Lyster47040.69%
||
|James R. Lowery47841.39%
|
|W.H. Anderson20717.92%
||
|Alwyn Bramley-Moore
|-
|Athabasca
||
|Alexander Grant MacKay5,327838.90%
|
|J.H. Wood22134.80%
|
|
||
|Jean Léon Côté
|-
|Beaver River
||
|Wilfrid Gariepy45761.67%
|
|A. Grey28438.33%
|
|
|
|New District
|-
|Bow Valley
||
|George Lane39661.78%
|
|Harold William Hounsfield Riley24538.22%
|
|
|
|New District
|-
|Centre Calgary
|
|John Chantler McDougall72831.76%
||
|Thomas M.M. Tweedie1,56468.24%
|
|
||
|New District from CalgaryThomas M.M. Tweedie
|-
|North Calgary
|
|George Henry Ross82232.11%
||
|Samuel Bacon Hillocks1,48257.89%
|
|Harry Roderick Burge (Socialist)25610.00%
|
|New District from Calgary
|-
|South Calgary
|
|Clifford Teasdale Jones1,42328.03%
||
|Thomas H. Blow3,65471.97%
|
|
|
|New District from Calgary
|-
|Camrose
||
|George P. Smith1,65186.89%
|
|R.L. Rushton24913.11%
|
|
||
|George P. Smith
|-
|Cardston
||
|Martin Woolf51851.96%
|
|C. Jensen47948.04%
|
|
||
|John William Woolf
|-
|Claresholm
||
|William Moffat49651.08%
|
|D.S. McMillan34835.84%
|
|G. Malshow12713.08%
||
|Malcolm McKenzie
|-
|Clearwater
||
|Henry William McKenney4038.83%
|
|A. Williamson Taylor3937.86%
|
|Joseph Andrew Clarke (Socialist)2423.30%
|
|New District
|-
|Cochrane
||
|Charles Wellington Fisher47555.56%
|
|H.F. Jarrett38044.44%
|
|
||
|Charles Wellington Fisher
|-
|Coronation
||
|Frank H. Whiteside73951.61%
|
|William Wallace Wilson69348.39%
|
|
|
|New District
|-
|Didsbury
||
|Joseph E. Stauffer94859.32%
|
|G.B. Sexsmith65040.68%
|
|
||
|Joseph E. Stauffer
|-
|rowspan="2" |Edmonton
||
|Charles Wilson Cross5,40726.29%
|
|William Antrobus Griesbach4,49921.87%
|
|J.D. Blayney (Temperance)6433.13%
||
|Charles Wilson Cross
|-
|
|Alexander Grant MacKay4,91323.89%
||
|Albert Freeman Ewing5,10724.83%
|
|
||
|John Alexander McDougall
|-
|Edmonton-South
|
|Alexander Cameron Rutherford1,27545.57%
||
|Herbert Howard Crawford1,52354.43%
|
|
||
|Renamed from StrathconaAlexander Cameron Rutherford
|-
|Edson
||
|Charles Wilson Cross6,078462.21%
|
|H.H. Verge64448.97%
|
|
|
|New District
|-
|Gleichen
||
|John P. McArthur64152.67%
|
|George McElroy57647.33%
|
|
||
|Ezra H. Riley
|-
|Grouard
||
|Jean Léon Côté34763.32%
|
|O. Travers20136.68%
|
|
|
|New District
|-
|Hand Hills
||
|Robert Berry Eaton96253.36%
|
|Albert J. Robertson84146.64%
|
|
|
|New District
|-
|High River
|
|R.L. McMillan55847.53%
||
|George Douglas Stanley61652.47%
|
|
||
|Louis Melville Roberts
|-
|Innisfail
|
|John A. Simpson52649.58%
||
|Frederick William Archer53550.42%
|
|
||
|John A. Simpson
|-
|Lac Ste. Anne
||
|Peter Gunn51752.17%
|
|George R. Barker47447.83%
|
|
||
|Peter Gunn
|-
|Lacombe
||
|William Franklin Puffer87858.46%
|
|Angus MacDonald62441.54%
|
|
||
|William Franklin Puffer
|-
|Leduc
||
|Stanley G. Tobin58257.17%
|
|George Curry43642.83%
|
|
||
|Robert T. Telford
|-
|Lethbridge City
|
|J.O. Jones1,03338.46%
||
|John S. Stewart1,37151.04%
|
|Joseph R. Knight (Socialist)28210.50%
||
|John S. Stewart
|-
|Little Bow
||
|James McNaughton72152.02%
|
|John T. MacDonald33924.46%
|
|F.A. Bryant (Ind.)20214.57%Alfred Buddon (Socialist)1248.95%
|
|New District
|-
|Macleod
|
|Arthur L. Sifton56049.17%
||
|Robert Patterson57950.83%
|
|
||
|Robert Patterson
|-
|Medicine Hat
|
|Charles Richmond Mitchell1,82349.73%
||
|Nelson C. Spencer1,84350.27%
|
|
||
|William Thomas Finlay
|-
|Nanton
||
|John M. Glendenning46359.51%
|
|J.T. Cooper31540.49%
|
|
||
|John M. Glendenning
|-
|Okotoks
|
|John A. Turner38039.01%
||
|George Hoadley59460.99%
|
|
||
|George Hoadley
|-
|Olds
||
|Duncan Marshall70951.94%
|
|George H. Cloakey65648.06%
|
|
||
|Duncan Marshall
|-
|Peace River
|
|William A. Rae43745.57%
||
|Alphaeus Patterson47549.53%
|
|William Bredin (Ind. Liberal)474.90%
||
|James K. Cornwall
|-
|Pembina
||
|Gordon MacDonald43250.64%
|
|F.D. Armitage42149.36%
|
|
||
|Henry William McKenney
|-
|Pincher Creek
|
|A.N. Mount42646.66%
||
|John H.W.S. Kemmis48753.34%
|
|
||
|David Warnock
|-
|Ponoka
||
|William A. Campbell48551.65%
|
|George Gordon25727.37%
|
|P. Baker19720.98%
||
|William A. Campbell
|-
|Red Deer
|
|Robert B. Welliver78642.44%
||
|Edward Michener86946.92%
|
|George Patton19710.64%
||
|Edward Michener
|-
|Redcliff
||
|Charles S. Pingle64560.11%
|
|H.S. Gerow42839.89%
|
|
|
|New District
|-
|Ribstone
||
|James Gray Turgeon66955.56%
|
|William John Blair53544.44%
|
|
|
|New District
|-
|Rocky Mountain
|
|William B. Powell51619.60%
||
|Robert E. Campbell1,09941.74%
|
|Charles M. O'Brien (Socialist)1,01838.66%
||
|Charles M. O'Brien
|-
|Sedgewick
||
|Charles Stewart88970.56%
|
|W. Watson37129.44%
|
|
||
|Charles Stewart
|-
|St. Albert
||
|Lucien Boudreau62060.55%
|
|Hector L. Landry40439.45%
|
|
||
|Lucien Boudreau
|-
|St. Paul
||
|Prosper-Edmond Lessard44155.75%
|
|L. Garneau35044.25%
|
|
|
|New District
|-
|Stettler
||
|Robert L. Shaw92845.65%
|
|George W. Morris90744.61%
|
|Malcolm McNeil1989.74%
||
|Robert L. Shaw
|-
|Stony Plain
|
|John A. McPherson36838.94%
||
|Conrad Weidenhammer57761.06%
|
|
||
|John A. McPherson
|-
|Sturgeon
||
|John Robert Boyle93662.73%
|
|James Duncan Hyndman55637.27%
|
|
||
|John Robert Boyle
|-
|Taber
||
|Archibald J. McLean1,23168.16%
|
|William C. Ives34118.88%
|
|Thomas E. Smith (Socialist)23412.96%
|
|New District
|-
|Vegreville
||
|Joseph S. McCallum81245.72%
|
|F.A. Morrison42023.65%
|
|Peter Savarich54430.63%
||
|James Bismark Holden
|-
|Vermilion
||
|Arthur L. Sifton77247.68%
|
|J. George Clark57135.27%
|
|Gregory Krikevsky27617.05%
||
|Archibald Campbell
|-
|Victoria
||
|Francis A. Walker77362.49%
|
|R.A. Bennett26821.67%
|
|M. Gowda19615.84%
||
|Francis A. Walker
|-
|Wainwright
|
|H.Y. Pawling61546.38%
||
|George LeRoy Hudson71153.62%
|
|
|
|New District
|-
|Warner
||
|Frank S. Leffingwell31443.67%
|
|W.H. Scott13719.05%
|
|William T. Patton26837.27%
|
|New District
|-
|Wetaskiwin
||
|Charles H. Olin78057.35%
|
|George B. Campbell58042.65%
|
|
||
|Charles H. Olin
|-
|Whitford
||
|Andrew S. Shandro49945.70%
|
|R.L. Hughson13312.18%
|
|Paul Rudyk (Ind.)31228.57%C. F. Connolly (Ind.)14813.55%	
|
|New District
|-
|}

See also
List of Alberta political parties

References

Citations

Bibliography

 

 Application by law clerk to stop election Edmonton Daily Bulletin 5 April 1913

Further reading

Biographic books about members
 

1913 elections in Canada
1913
March 1913 events in North America
1913 in Alberta